Stoke Park is a public open space of  in Bristol, England. It occupies a prominent position on the eastern flanks of Purdown, alongside the M32 motorway, together with the landmark Dower House and Purdown transmitter. Approximately 80% of the park is within the Bristol ward of Lockleaze; the remainder is within South Gloucestershire. 

Bristol City Council plan to extend cattle grazing throughout the park between April and November 2018 to stop the spread of invasive scrub and as an educational resource. 
There has been some public opposition to developments in the park. Petitions have opposed the felling of hundreds of trees in a stretch of young woodland and the construction of a 3m wide path which could stretch for nearly 2km across the park's meadows.

The Dower House

The Dower House is one of Bristol's more prominent landmarks, set on a hill above the M32 motorway on the main approach into the city, and painted yellow. The house was built in 1553 by Sir Richard Berkeley. It has also been used as part of Stoke Park Hospital. The house closed as a hospital in 1985, and has been converted into flats.

Duchess Pond
Within Stoke Park are two small lakes, the largest of which is Duchess Pond. It is used for angling and also supports breeding birds which are scarce elsewhere in Bristol, for example, reed warbler and reed bunting; in addition, an Egyptian goose was seen here in 2006 and a bittern in 2014.

Listed structures
Several aspects of the house and estate are listed. The house is Grade II* listed. The balustraded terrace, the Orangery, the remains of the obelisk, and the Broomhill Gate are all Grade II listed. The woods contain the Beaufort Memorial, the cold bath, a stone tunnel, and a partially derelict stone tunnel with rusticated entrance arches, all also Grade II listed.

Other facilities
 Hermitage Tunnel
 Purdown BT Tower
 Woodland
 World War II gun emplacements on Purdown:
The site was first established in 1939 to hold mobile anti-aircraft guns, but was converted to a permanent concrete reinforced battery in June 1940. Manned by the Royal artillery regiment, the site included octagonal gun emplacements, integral ammunition bays and shelters with surrounding blast walls as well as a command post. Most of the structures survive and are still clearly observable.

References

External links

Stoke Park Estate, Bristol City Council
The History of Stoke Park, edited by Adrian Kerton, Glenside Museum
Stoke Park, Bristol Outline Management Plan, Cooper Partnership, September 1999

Parks and open spaces in Bristol